Melody (originally marketed as S.W.A.L.K. in the UK) is a 1971 British children's romantic comedy-drama film directed by Waris Hussein about puppy love. The film starred Jack Wild, Mark Lester and Tracy Hyde. Although the film was a box office disappointment in both the United States and Britain, it turned out to be a hit in Japan as well as in some Latin American countries such as Mexico, Argentina and Chile, and a modest hit in South Africa.

Plot
This romantic story is told through the viewpoint of the children in the story, the adults playing only supporting roles. Daniel Latimer befriends the troublesome Ornshaw. However, when Daniel falls in love with Melody Perkins, the boys' friendship becomes jeopardized, as Ornshaw grows jealous of the amount of time that Daniel gives her. Initially embarrassed by the attention, Melody comes to return Daniel's feelings, and the couple announce to their parents that they want to get married. Not sometime in the future, but now. The adults attempt to dissuade them, but Daniel and Melody's determination leads Ornshaw to have a change of heart. Their classmates gather together at one of the children's hideouts to 'marry' the couple, with their discovery leading to a final showdown between children and teachers. Ornshaw helps Melody and Daniel get away on a train pulley car and chases the English teacher off.

Cast
 Mark Lester as Daniel Latimer
 Tracy Hyde as Melody Perkins
 Jack Wild as Tom Ornshaw
 Colin Barrie as Chambers
 Billy Franks as Burgess
 Ashley Knight as Stacey
 Craig Marriott as Dadds
 William Vanderpuye as O'Leary
 Peter Walton as Fensham
 Camille Davies as Muriel
 Dawn Hope as Maureen
 Kay Skinner as Peggy
 Lesley Roach as Rhoda 
 Sheila Steafel as Mrs. Latimer
 Keith Barron as Mr. Latimer
 Kate Williams as Mrs Perkins
 Roy Kinnear as Mr. Perkins
 Hilda Barry as Grandma Perkins
 James Cossins as Headmaster
 Ken Jones as Mr. Dicks
 June Jago as Miss Fairfax
 June C. Ellis as Miss Dimkins
 Tim Wylton as Mr. Fellows
 John Gorman as Boys' Brigade Captain
 Petal Young as Betty
 Robin Hunter as George
 Tracy Reed as (Television Film) Woman in Hospital
 Neil Hallett as (Television Film) Man in Hospital
 Leonard Brockwell as Boys' Group
 Stephen Mallett as Boys' Group

Production

Filming
Film production began in the spring of 1970 shooting on location in Hammersmith, and Lambeth in the greater London area. Post-production was completed at the Twickenham Studios. The graveyard scenes of the film were shot on location at Brompton Cemetery and Nunhead Cemetery. The seaside scenes in the latter part of the film were shot in Weymouth, Dorset.

This was the first screenplay by film director Alan Parker. Parker did some second-unit direction for the film, shooting the montage sequences of the school children at break-time and at the sports day.

Casting
Mark Lester (Daniel Latimer) and Jack Wild (Ornshaw) had previously appeared together in the 1968 musical film adaptation of Oliver!. They were joined by the child model Tracy Hyde in the title role. Other cast members included Kate Williams and Roy Kinnear as Melody's parents, and Sheila Steafel and Keith Barron as Daniel's parents.

This was the feature film debut of then child model and commercial actress Tracy Hyde at the age of 11. Writer/Director Andrew Birkin recommended Tracy Hyde for the title role of Melody Perkins to director Waris Hussein after screening and auditioning over 100 girls. Actor Jack Wild, who played Ornshaw, was actually 17 at the time of the production.

Music

The film's musical soundtrack included songs by the Bee Gees ("In the Morning", "Melody Fair", "Give Your Best", and the hit singles "To Love Somebody" and "First of May"), and the Crosby, Stills, Nash and Young hit "Teach Your Children".

Home media
Melody was mastered for Region 2 format on DVD by Kadokawa Pictures in Japan. Kadokawa released it on Region A Blu-ray in Japan on December 22, 2015 and StudioCanal released it on Region B Blu-ray on May 8, 2017.

References

External links
 
 
 

1971 comedy-drama films
1971 films
British comedy-drama films
British independent films
Films directed by Waris Hussein
Films produced by David Puttnam
Films set in London
Films shot in London
Films shot at Twickenham Film Studios
Films with screenplays by Alan Parker
1971 independent films
1970s English-language films
1970s British films